Below is a list of theaters in Maine.

Aroostook County 

 University Players at the University of Maine at Presque Isle in Presque Isle, ME

Down East and Acadia 

 The Barn Arts Collective in Bass Harbor, ME
 The Grand in Ellsworth, ME
 ImprovAcadia in Bar Harbor, ME
 New Surry Theatre and Performing Arts School in Blue Hill, ME
 Opera House Arts in Stonington, ME
 ISLE Theater Company in Deer Isle, ME

Greater Portland 

 60 Grit Theatre Company in Portland, ME
 Acorn Productions in Portland, ME
 Bare Portland Theater in Portland, ME
 Cast Aside Productions in Portland, ME
 Dramatic Repertory Company in Portland, ME
 Fenix Theatre Company in Portland, ME
 Good Theater in Portland, ME
 Mad Horse Theatre Company in Portland, ME
 Opera Maine in Portland, ME
 Pie Man Theatre Company in South Portland, ME
 Portland Stage Company in Portland, ME
 Snowlion Repertory Company in Portland, ME

Midcoast 

 Belfast Maskers in Belfast, ME
 Cold Comfort Theater in Belfast, ME
 Maine State Music Theatre in Brunswick, ME
 Midcoast Actors' Studio in Belfast, ME
The Colonial Theatre in Belfast, ME
 The Theater Project in Brunswick, ME

River Valley 

 Theater at Monmouth in Monmouth, ME
 Waterville Opera House in Waterville, ME

Southern Coast 

 City Theater in Biddeford, ME
 Hackmatack Playhouse in Berwick, ME
 Ogunquit Playhouse in Ogunquit, ME

Highlands 

 Penobscot Theatre Company in Bangor, ME
True North Theatre in Orono, ME

Lakes and mountains (south Paris etc) 

 Celebration Barn Theater in South Paris, ME
 The Public Theatre in Lewiston, ME

References 

Regional theatre in the United States

Maine
Theaters